The Wallace Line or Wallace's Line is a faunal boundary line drawn in 1859 by the British naturalist Alfred Russel Wallace and named by the English biologist Thomas Henry Huxley that separates the biogeographical realms of Asia and Wallacea, a transitional zone between Asia and Australia known as the Indo-Australian Archipelago. To the west of the line are found organisms related to Asiatic species; to the east, a mixture of species of Asian and Australian origins is present. Wallace noticed this clear division in both land mammals and birds during his travels through the East Indies in the 19th century.

The line runs through Indonesia, between Borneo and Sulawesi (Celebes), and through the Lombok Strait between Bali and Lombok, where the distance is strikingly small, about 35 kilometers (22 mi), but enough for a contrast in species present in each island. The complex biogeography of the Indo-Australian Archipelago is a result of its location at the merging point of four major tectonic plates and other semi-isolated microplates in combination with ancient sea levels. Those caused the isolation of different taxonomic groups in islands relatively close to each other. Wallace’s Line is one of the many boundaries drawn by naturalists and biologists since the mid-1800s intended to delineate the distribution constraints of the fauna and flora of the Archipelago.

Historical context 

One of the earliest descriptions of the biodiversity in the Indo-Australian Archipelago dates back to 1521 when the Venetian explorer Antonio Pigafetta recorded the biological contrasts between the Philippines and the Maluku Islands (Spice Islands) (on opposite sides of the Wallace’s Line) during the continuation of the voyage of Ferdinand Magellan, after Magellan had been killed on Mactan. Later on, the English navigator George Windsor Earl published his observations in faunal differences between the islands in the Indo-Australian Archipelago. In his article On the Physical Geography of South-Eastern Asia and Australia (1845), he described how shallow seas connected islands on the west (Sumatra, Java, etc.) with the Asian continent and with similar wildlife, and islands on the east such as New Guinea were connected to Australia and were characterized by the presence of marsupials. Salomon Müller, a German naturalist, proposed similar ideas to Earl’s concerning the faunal boundaries in his work between 1839 to 1845, followed by the English ornithologist Philip Sclater who outlined in 1858 the divergence of the bird species in each region. These early investigations assisted Wallace in developing his theories about the biogeography which he stated publicly in his 1859 paper after extensively traveling the region. He proposed a line to the east of Bali since "all the islands eastward of Borneo and Java formed part of an Australian or Pacific Continent, from which they were separated." The proposal of the line, however, was not the main objective of Wallace’s endeavours.

His primary purpose was in fact to understand the geological phenomena and the colonization events that caused the boundaries in faunal distribution in the region through the development of his theories of evolution and biogeography. Wallace's studies in Indonesia demonstrated the emerging theory of evolution, at about the same time as Joseph Dalton Hooker and Asa Gray published essays also supporting Darwin's hypothesis. On the other hand, the lack of knowledge of tectonic plates, and the uncertainty about biodiversity in the Philippines, left Wallace with some contradicting points he had to deal with concerning his theory on biogeography. In fact, he did not include the Philippines in his 1859 paper, and the determination of a line in honor of his name was suggested by Thomas Huxley in an 1868 paper to the Zoological Society of London. Huxley studied the distribution of gallinaceous birds in the archipelago and noticed that species in the Philippines were remarkably distinct from those in the Asiatic realm. Based on that, he re-drew Wallace’s boundary placing the Philippines to the west of the division and coined it as “Wallace’s Line”, although Wallace himself refused to include the Philippines to the west.

Because of the complexity of the geographical landscape and the differences in diversity of organisms around the archipelago, continuous attempts to characterize faunal and botanical boundaries were carried out after Wallace. Some of them are Scatler Line (1894), Lydekker’s Line (1896), Pelseneer’s Faunal Balance (1904), and Mayr’s Faunal Balance (1944). In addition, several smaller transition sub-regions boundaries were also proposed.

More recent work assessing biodiversity assemblages, phylogeny and using computer-based geospatial tools to analyze previous boundaries have led to patterns of division similar to those proposed through the 19th century, although some special cases not explained before are reinforced by these modern analyzes. Rueda et al. (2013), for instance, evaluated the distribution of land mammals, birds and amphibians in Wallace’s realms and concluded that the boundaries suggested by Wallace remain valid. Ali et al. (2020), in a different attempt, studied the fauna of Christmas Island and indicated that most of the ancestral colonizers of the Island's land mammals and amphibians disappeared from the Lombok Strait. Therefore, they propose a re-conformation of the Wallace’s Line so that the Christmas Island would be sited on the Australasian side of the biogeographical divide instead of the Oriental side.

Biogeography

Understanding of the biogeography of the region centers on the relationship of ancient sea levels to the continental shelves. Wallace's Line is visible geographically when the continental shelf contours are examined. It figures as a deep-water channel that separates the southeastern edge of the Sunda Shelf from the Sahul Shelf. The Sunda Shelf links Borneo, Bali, Java, and Sumatra underwater to the mainland of southeastern Asia, while the Sahul Shelf connects Australia to New Guinea.

During the Glacial Period, when the ocean levels were up to 120 metres (390 ft) lower, both shelves were connected, uniting Asia and Australia with what are now islands on their respective continental shelves as continuous land masses. However, with the rise of sea levels, both were split in two shelves. Consequently, for over 50 million years, deep water between those two large continental shelf areas created a barrier that kept the flora and fauna of Australia separated from those of Asia. It can reasonably be concluded it was an ocean barrier preventing species migration because the physical aspects of the separated islands are very similar. Thus, Wallacea region consists of islands that were maintained isolated on their respective continental land masses, causing only those organisms able to cross the straits between islands to populate them. Alternatively,"Weber's Line" runs through this transitional area (to the east of center), at the tipping point between Asian species against those with Australian origins.

Zoogeography 
The distributions of many bird species follow the limits of the line, since many birds do not cross even the shortest stretches of open ocean water. Among mammals, bats have distributions that can cross the line, but larger terrestrial mammals are generally limited to one side or the other. On the Australian side, many species of marsupials, and some monotremes are present, alongside native rodents - although the occurrence of rodents in this case is derived from more recent colonization events. By contrast, to the Asian side marsupials are excluded, and placental mammals such as apes, cats, elephants, monkeys, rhinoceroses, and other species are found. Exceptions to this include macaques, pigs and tarsiers on Sulawesi. Other groups of plants and animals show differing patterns, but the overall pattern is striking and reasonably consistent. Flora do not follow the Wallace Line to the same extent as fauna, since their colonization events differ in their ability to spread oversea.  One genus of plants that does not cross the Line is the Australasian genus Eucalyptus, except for one species, Eucalyptus deglupta, which naturally occurs on the island of Mindanao in the Philippines.

See also

Citations

General and cited references 
  with the original paper

Further reading

 Abdullah, M. T. (2003). Biogeography and variation of Cynopterus brachyotis in Southeast Asia. PhD thesis. The University of Queensland, St Lucia, Australia.
 Dawkins, Richard (2004). The Ancestor's Tale. Weidenfeld & Nicolson. . Chapter 14 "Marsupials".
 Hall, L. S., Gordon G. Grigg, Craig Moritz, Besar Ketol, Isa Sait, Wahab Marni and M. T. Abdullah (2004). "Biogeography of fruit bats in Southeast Asia". Sarawak Museum Journal LX(81):191-284.
 Simpson, George Gaylord (April 29, 1977). "Too Many Lines: The Limits of the Oriental and Australian Zoogeographic Regions"]. Proceedings of the American Philosophical Society. Vol. 121, No. 2. pp. 107–120. .
 van Oosterzee, Penny (1997). Where Worlds Collide: The Wallace Line.
 Wilson D. E., D. M. Reeder (2005). Mammal species of the world. Washington, D.C.: Smithsonian Institution Press.

External links

 Wallacea Research Group
 Map of Wallace's, Weber's and Lydekker's lines
 Pleistocene Sea Level Maps
 Wallacea - a transition zone from Asia to Australia, specially rich in marine life and on land

Biogeography
Celebes Sea
Ecoregions of Indonesia
Natural history of Indonesia
Regions of Southeast Asia
Wallacea
Indomalayan realm biota
Australasian realm biota